The Worthington City School District includes the city of Worthington, Village of Riverlea, and neighboring portions of Perry Township, Sharon Township, and the City of Columbus, Ohio. There are approximately 60,000 people residing in the area with 13,837 in Worthington proper as of 2013. Since July 1, 2015, Trent Bowers is the Superintendent of Worthington Schools.

The student enrollment for the Worthington School District was 9,925 for the 2015–2016 school year.

According to the district quality profile, 93% of Worthington graduates attend 2- or 4-year institutions of higher learning following graduation. The class of 2015 was offered more than $27 million in scholarship money. More than 75% of high school students participate in extracurricular activities, including 29 varsity sports, 40 clubs, music and performance activities.

A five member Board of Education is elected to lead the Worthington School District. Current BOE members include Board President, Jennifer Best, Nicolette Hudson, Amy Lloyd, Sam Shim, and Charlie Wilson.

Report card
Worthington Schools offers over 180 different courses, with over 400 students given the chance to earn college credit through a dual enrollment program. In 2015, Worthington Schools was given an A rating by the Ohio Department of Education for its graduation rate.

High schools

Thomas Worthington High School
Worthington Kilbourne High School
Linworth Alternative High School
Worthington Academy

Middle schools
Kilbourne Middle School
McCord Middle School
Perry Middle School
Phoenix Middle School (alternative middle school program)
Worthingway Middle School

Elementary schools
Bluffsview Elementary
Brookside Elementary
Colonial Hills Elementary
Evening Street Elementary
Granby Elementary
Liberty Elementary
Slate Hill Elementary
Wilson Hill Elementary
Worthington Estates Elementary
Worthington Hills Elementary
Worthington Park Elementary

Preschool
Sutter Park (housing the district's special education preschool program)

References

External links

Worthington Schools Groundbreaking Educational Programs

School districts in Ohio
Education in Franklin County, Ohio
Education in Columbus, Ohio
Worthington, Ohio